Antonio Santucci (30  October 1928 – 26 September 2018) was an Italian Catholic bishop.

Santucci was born in Italy and was ordained to the priesthood in 1951. He served as bishop of the Diocese of Trivento, Italy, from 1985 to 2005.

Notes

1928 births
2018 deaths
20th-century Italian Roman Catholic bishops
21st-century Italian Roman Catholic bishops
People from the Province of L'Aquila